The 2017 Kentucky Wildcats baseball team represented the University of Kentucky during the 2017 NCAA Division I baseball season. The Wildcats played their home games at Cliff Hagan Stadium as a member of the Southeastern Conference. They were led by head coach Nick Mingione, who was in his first year at Kentucky. Following the conclusion of the regular season, the Wildcats were selected to host their second NCAA Regional, the first since 2006.  The Wildcats won their regional, and faced Louisville in the super regionals, losing 2 games to none.

Roster

Schedule

! style="background:#0033A0;color:white;"| Regular Season
|- valign="top" 

|- align="center" bgcolor="#ffbbbb"
| February 17 || #12  || || Boshamer Stadium • Chapel Hill || L 1–3 || Bukauskas (1–0) || Hjalle (0–1) || Hiatt (1) || 1,763 || 0–1 ||
|- align="center" bgcolor="#ffbbbb"
| February 18 || #12 North Carolina || || Boshamer Stadium • Chapel Hill || L 5–6 || Morgan (1–0) || Logue (0–1) || Hiatt (2) || 2,551 || 0–2 ||
|- align="center" bgcolor="#ffbbbb"
| February 19 || #12 North Carolina || || Boshamer Stadium • Chapel Hill || L 4–5 || Dalatri (1–0) || Lewis (0–1) || Hiatt (3) || 2,632 || 0–3 ||
|- align="center" bgcolor="#ffbbbb"
| February 22 ||  || || Liberty Baseball Stadium • Lynchburg, VA || L 4–5 || Tarantola (1–0) || Thompson (0–1) || Degroat (1) || 1,335 || 0–4 ||
|- align="center" bgcolor="#ccffcc"
| February 24 || vs.  || || Bud Metheny Complex • Norfolk, VA || W 16–9 || Pop (1–0) || Gorman (0–1) || None || 1,000 || 1–4 ||
|- align="center" bgcolor="#ccffcc"
| February 25 || vs.  || || Bud Metheny Complex • Norfolk, VA || W 19–2 || Logue (1–1) || Maguire (1–1) || None || 1,004 || 2–4 ||
|- align="center" bgcolor="#ffbbbb"
| February 26 || vs.  ||  || Bud Metheny Complex • Norfolk, VA || L 3–4 || Meeker (1–1) || Salow (0–1) || Marinaccio (1) || 1,056 || 2–5 ||
|- align="center" bgcolor="#ccffcc"
| February 28 ||  || || Cliff Hagan Stadium • Lexington, KY || W 12–0 || Schaenzer (1–0) || Quillens (0–1) || None || 1,846 || 3–5 ||
|-

|- align="center" bgcolor="#ccffcc"
| March 1 ||  || || Cliff Hagan Stadium • Lexington, KY || W 17–2 || Thompson (1–1) || Acosta (0–1) || None || 2,015 || 4–5 ||
|- align="center" bgcolor="#ccffcc"
| March 3 || #23  || || Cliff Hagan Stadium • Lexington, KY || W 2–1 || Hjelle (1–1) || Davis (2–1) || Cleary (1) || 1,942 || 5–5 ||
|- align="center" bgcolor="#ccffcc"
| March 4 || #23 UCSB || || Cliff Hagan Stadium • Lexington, KY || W 2–1 || Logue (2–1) || Nelson (2–1) || Salow (1) || 2,273 || 6–5 ||
|- align="center" bgcolor="#ccffcc"
| March 5 || #23 UCSB || || Cliff Hagan Stadium • Lexington, KY || W 12–1 || Lewis (1–1) || Ledesma (0–1) || None || 2,439 || 7–5 ||
|- align="center" bgcolor="#ccffcc"
| March 7 ||  || || Cliff Hagan Stadium • Lexington, KY || W 15–1 || Schaenzer (2–1) || Swaney (1–1) || None || 1,830 || 8–5 ||
|- align="center" bgcolor="#ffbbbb"
| March 8 ||  || || Marge Schott Stadium • Cincinnati, OH || L 1–2 || Kullman (3–1) || Salow (0–2) || None || 733 || 8–6 ||
|- align="center" bgcolor="#ccffcc"
| March 9 ||  || || Cliff Hagan Stadium • Lexington, KY || W 6–4 || Hjelle (2–1) || Gnetz (0–3) || Cleary (2) || 2,099 || 9–6 ||
|- align="center" bgcolor="#ccffcc"
| March 10 || Miami (OH) || || Cliff Hagan Stadium • Lexington, KY || W 16–3 || Logue (3–1) || Spears (1–3) || None || 1,850 || 10–6 ||
|- align="center" bgcolor="#ccffcc"
| March 12 || Miami (OH) || || Cliff Hagan Stadium • Lexington, KY || W 14–2 || Lewis (2–1) || Schwartz (1–1) || None || 1,829 || 11–6 ||
|- align="center" bgcolor="#ccffcc"
| March 14 ||  || || Cliff Hagan Stadium • Lexington, KY || W 9–7 || Cleary (1–0) || Lollar (0–1) || Salow (2) || 1,758 || 12–6 ||
|- align="center" bgcolor="#ccffcc"
| March 17 || Texas A&M || || Olsen Field at Blue Bell Park • College Station, TX || W 6–0 || Hjelle (3–1) || Hill (4–1) || None || 5,242 || 13–6 || 1–0
|- align="center" bgcolor="#ccffcc"
| March 18 || Texas A&M || || Olsen Field at Blue Bell Park • College Station, TX || W 7–6 || Schaenzer (3–0) || Cason (4–1) || Salow (3) || 5,796 || 14–6 || 2–0
|- align="center" bgcolor="#ccffcc"
| March 19 || Texas A&M || || Olsen Field at Blue Bell Park • College Station, TX || W 11–7 || Lewis (3–1) || Kilkenny (2–1) || None || 4,472 || 15–6 || 3–0
|- align="center" bgcolor="#ccffcc"
| March 21 ||  || || Bowling Green Ballpark • Bowling Green, Kentucky || W 4–3 || Thompson (2–1) || Ciocco (0–3) || Salow (4) || 2,825 || 16–6 ||
|- align="center" bgcolor="#ffbbbb"
| March 23 || Ole Miss || || Cliff Hagan Stadium • Lexington, KY || L 6–9 || McArthur (1–1) || Hjelle (3–2) || Woolfolk (6) || 2,738 || 16–7 || 3–1
|- align="center" bgcolor="#ccffcc"
| March 24 || Ole Miss || || Cliff Hagan Stadium • Lexington, KY || W 4–2 || Logue (4–1) || Holston (0–2) || Salow (5) || 2,770 || 17–7 || 4–1
|- align="center" bgcolor="#ccffcc"
| March 25 || Ole Miss || || Cliff Hagan Stadium • Lexington, KY || W 4–1 || Lewis (4–1) || Ethridge (1–1) || Salow (6) || 2,841 || 18–7 || 5–1
|- align="center" bgcolor="#ccffcc"
| March 28 || Cincinnati Bearcats || || Cliff Hagan Stadium • Lexington, KY || W 13–7 || Schaenzer (4–0) || Kullman 3–3  || None || 2,150 || 19–7 ||
|- align="center" bgcolor="#ccffcc"
| March 31 || Vanderbilt  || || Cliff Hagan Stadium • Lexington, KY || W 7–4 || Hjelle (4–2)  || Raby 4–3  || None || 3,071 || 20–7 || 6–1
|-

|- align="center" bgcolor="#ccffcc"
| April 1 || Vanderbilt  || || Cliff Hagan Stadium • Lexington, KY || W 10–3 || Logue (5–1)  || Wright (1–4)  || None || 2,465 || 21–7 || 7–1
|- align="center" bgcolor="#ffbbbb"
| April 2 || Vanderbilt  || || Cliff Hagan Stadium • Lexington, KY || L 4–6 || Conger (2–0)  || Pop (1–1)  || Ruppenthal (3) || 3,512 || 21–8 || 7–2
|- align="center" bgcolor="#ffbbbb"
| April 4 ||  Louisville || || Jim Patterson Stadium • Louisville, KY || L 3–5 || Hummel (3–0)  || Thompson (2–2)  || Henzman (8) || 6,210 || 21–9 || 
|- align="center" bgcolor="#ccffcc"
| April 7 || Mississippi State  || || Dudy Noble Field • Starkville, MS || W 5–2 || Salow (1–2)  || Barlow (0–1)  || None || 9,256 || 22–9 || 8–2
|- align="center" bgcolor="#ffbbbb"
| April 8 || Mississippi State  || || Dudy Noble Field • Starkville, MS || L 6–10 || Plumlee (4–1)  || Logue (5–2)  || None || 13,691 || 22–10 || 8–3
|- align="center" bgcolor="#ffbbbb"
| April 9 || Mississippi State  || || Dudy Noble Field • Starkville, MS || L 6–10 || Jolly (1–1)  || Lewis (4–2)  || Price (10) || 8,082 || 22–11 || 8–4
|- align="center" bgcolor="#ccffcc"
| April 12 ||  || || Cliff Hagan Stadium • Lexington, KY || W 8–0 || Thompson (3–2) || Peyton (0–3) || None || 2,511 || 23–11 || 
|- align="center" bgcolor="#ccffcc"
| April 14 || Mizzou || || Taylor Stadium • Columbia, MO || W 5–2 || Hjelle (5–2) || Houck (3–5)  || Salow (7) || 2,402 || 24–11 || 9–4 
|- align="center" bgcolor="#ffbbbb"
| April 15 || Mizzou || || Taylor Stadium • Columbia, MO || L 8–9 || Sikkema (6–0) || Logue (5–3)  || None || 2,402 || 24–12 || 9–5
|- align="center" bgcolor="#ccffcc"
| April 16 || Mizzou || || Taylor Stadium • Columbia, MO || W 6–1 || Lewis (5–2) || Montes (3–2)  || Salow (8) || 2,402 || 25–12 || 10–5
|- align="center" bgcolor="#ccffcc"
| April 18 ||  Louisville || || Cliff Hagan Stadium • Lexington, KY || W 11–7 || Thompson (4–2)  || Hummel (4–1)  || None || 4,018 || 26–12 || 
|- align="center" bgcolor="#ccffcc"
| April 21 ||  LSU || || Cliff Hagan Stadium • Lexington, KY || W 12–5 || Hjelle (6–2)  || Poche' (6–3)  || None ||  || 27–12 || 11–5
|- align="center" bgcolor="#ffbbbb"
| April 21 ||  LSU || || Cliff Hagan Stadium • Lexington, KY || L 3–4 || Hess (4–0) || Salow (1–3)  || None || 3,847 || 27–13 || 11–6
|- align="center" bgcolor="#ccffcc"
| April 23 ||  LSU || || Cliff Hagan Stadium • Lexington, KY || W 10–2 || Lewis (6–2) || Walker (5–1)  || None || 3,311 || 28–13 || 12–6
|- align="center" bgcolor="#ccffcc"
| April 26 ||   || || Cliff Hagan Stadium • Lexington, KY || W 6–0 || Thompson (5–2 )  || Williams (1–1)  || None || 2,950 || 29–13 || 
|- align="center" bgcolor="#ccffcc"
| April 28 ||  South Carolina || || Founders Park • Columbia, SC || W 19–1 || Hjelle (7–2)  || Crowe (4–4)  || None || 7,753  || 30–13 || 13–6 
|- align="center" bgcolor="#ffbbbb"
| April 29 ||  South Carolina || || Founders Park • Columbia, SC || L 1–5 || Hill (3–3) || Logue (5–4) || Johnson (7)  || 8,025  || 30–14 || 13–7
|- align="center" bgcolor="#ccffcc"
| April 30 ||  South Carolina || || Founders Park • Columbia, SC || W 9–4 || Salow (2–3) ||Johnson (0–1) || None  || 7,115   || 31–14 || 14–7
|-

|- align="center" bgcolor="#ffbbbb"
| May 5 ||   || || Cliff Hagan Stadium • Lexington, KY || L 3–5 || Kristofak (3–1)  || Salow (2–4)  || Smith (2) || 1,917  || 31–15 || 14–8
|- align="center" bgcolor="#ccffcc"
| May 6 ||  Georgia || || Cliff Hagan Stadium • Lexington, KY || W 7–4 || Logue (6–4)  || Adkins (5–6)  || Thompson (1) || 2,483  || 32–15 || 15–8
|- align="center" bgcolor="#ffbbbb"
| May 7 ||  Georgia || || Cliff Hagan Stadium • Lexington, KY || L 3–6 || Smith (3–5)  || Salow (2–5)  || None || 2,897 || 32–16 || 15–9
|- align="center" bgcolor="#ccffcc"
| May 9 ||  Indiana || || Cliff Hagan Stadium • Lexington, KY || W 5–2 || Thompson (6–2)  || Hobbie (2–5)  || Salow (9) || 2,442  || 33–16 || 
|- align="center" bgcolor="#ccffcc"
| May 12 ||  Tennessee || || Cliff Hagan Stadium • Lexington, KY || W 15–5 || Hjelle (8–2)  || Martin (5–6)  || None  || 2,368  || 34–16 || 16–9 
|- align="center" bgcolor="#ccffcc"
| May 13 ||  Tennessee || || Cliff Hagan Stadium • Lexington, KY || W 8–3 || Machamer (1–0)  || Stallings (3–3)  || None  || 3,793  || 35–16 || 17–9 
|- align="center" bgcolor="#ccffcc"
| May 14 ||  Tennessee || || Cliff Hagan Stadium • Lexington, KY || W 7–2 || Thompson (7–2)  || Warren (2–5)  || Salow (10)  || 3,085  || 36–16 || 18–9 
|- align="center" bgcolor="#ccffcc"
| May 16 ||   || || Cliff Hagan Stadium • Lexington, KY || W 10–1 || Schaenzer (5–0)  || Ganns (3–7)  || None || 2,484  || 37–16 || 
|- align="center" bgcolor="#ccffcc"
| May 18 ||  Florida || || McKethan Stadium • Gainesville, FL || W 12–4 || Hjelle (9–2)  || Faedo (7–2)  || None  || 3,693  || 38–16 || 19–9 
|- align="center" bgcolor="#ffbbbb"
| May 19 ||  Florida || || McKethan Stadium • Gainesville, FL || L 3–14 || Singer (7–3)  || Logue (6–5)  || None  || 4,153 || 38–17 || 19–10 
|- align="center" bgcolor="#ffbbbb"
| May 20 ||  Florida || || McKethan Stadium • Gainesville, FL || L 4–6 || Kowar (10–0)  || Logue (6–5)  || None  || 3,938 || 38–18 || 19–11 
|-

|-
! style="background:#0033A0;color:white;"| Postseason
|-

|- align="center" bgcolor="#bbffbb"
| May 24 || South Carolina || || Hoover Metropolitan Stadium • Hoover, AL || W 7–2 || Logue (7–5) || Morris (3–2) || Machamer (1) || 5,062 || 39–18 || 1–0
|- align="center" bgcolor="#ffbbbb"
| May 25 || LSU || || Hoover Metropolitan Stadium • Hoover, AL || L 0–10 || Lange (8–5) || Hjelle (9–3) || None || 9,823 || 39–19 || 1–1
|- align="center" bgcolor="#ffbbbb"
| May 26 || South Carolina || || Hoover Metropolitan Stadium • Hoover, AL || L 1–3 || Reagan (6–2) || Salow (2–5) || Johnson (10) || 9,823 || 39–20 || 1–2
|-

|- align="center" bgcolor="#bbffbb"
| June 2 ||  || || Cliff Hagan Stadium • Lexington, KY || W 6–4 || Hjelle (10–3) || Klein (5–3) || Salow (11) || 3,956 || 40–20 || 1–0
|- align="center" bgcolor="#ffbbbb"
| June 3 ||  || || Cliff Hagan Stadium • Lexington, KY || L 4–5 || Adler (6–6) || Lewis (6–4) || Staley (5) || 4,742 || 40–21 || 1–1
|- align="center" bgcolor="#bbffbb"
| June 4 || Indiana || || Cliff Hagan Stadium • Lexington, KY || W 14–9 || Thompson (8–2) || Krueger (5–2)  || None || 2,480 || 41–21 || 2–1
|- align="center" bgcolor="#bbffbb"
| June 4 || NC State || || Cliff Hagan Stadium • Lexington, KY || W 8–6 || Machamer (2–0) || Brown (4–2)  || None || 3,261 || 42–21 || 3–1
|- align="center" bgcolor="#bbffbb"
| June 5 || NC State || || Cliff Hagan Stadium • Lexington, KY || W 10–5 || Hjelle (11–3) || Beckman (0–2)  || None || 5,005 || 43–21 || 4–1
|-

|- align="center" bgcolor="#ffbbbb"
| June 9 || Louisville || || Jim Patterson Stadium • Louisville, KY || L 2–5 || McClure (8–3) || Thompson (8–3) || None || 6,235 || 43–22 || 0–1
|- align="center" bgcolor="#ffbbbb"
| June 10 || Louisville || || Jim Patterson Stadium • Louisville, KY || L 2–6 || McKay (10–3) || Hjelle (11–4) || Bordner (3) || 6,237 || 43–23 || 0–2
|-

Record vs. conference opponents

References

Kentucky Wildcats
Kentucky Wildcats baseball seasons
Kentucky Wildcats baseball
Kentucky Wildcats